Birds described in 1881  include  Cory's shearwater, Royal parrotfinch, Sulu pygmy woodpecker, Coppery emerald, Mexican whip-poor-will, Sepia-brown wren, Socotra warbler, Fiery-shouldered parakeet, Mrs. Hume's pheasant, Socotra golden-winged grosbeak, Blue-rumped pitta,

Events
Death of  John Gould and Louis Hippolyte Bouteille
Last specimens of Seychelles parakeet collected

Publications
Philip Lutley Sclater Monograph of the Jacamars and Puff-birds.
Philip Lutley Sclater  and  Gustav Hartlaub. On the Birds collected in Socotra by Prof. I. B. Balfour. Proceedings of the Zoological Society of London 1881 online
Robert George Wardlaw-Ramsay The Ornithological works of Arthur 9th Marquis of Tweeddale (1881)
Jean Cabanis, Anton Reichenow, Herman Schalow, Gustav Hartlaub  and other Germans in  Ornithologisches Centralblatt Leipzig :L.A. Kittler,1876-82. online 

Ongoing events
John Gould The birds of Asia 1850-83 7 vols. 530 plates, Artists: J. Gould, H. C. Richter, W. Hart and J. Wolf; Lithographers:H. C. Richter and W. Hart
Henry Eeles Dresser and Richard Bowdler Sharpe A History of the Birds of Europe, Including all the Species Inhabiting the Western Palearctic Region.Taylor & Francis of Fleet Street, London
José Vicente Barbosa du Bocage Ornithologie d'Angola. 2 volumes, 1877–1881.
Osbert Salvin and Frederick DuCane Godman 1879–1904. Biologia Centrali-Americana . Aves
Richard Bowdler Sharpe Catalogue of the Birds in the British Museum London,1874-98.
Jean Cabanis, Gustav Hartlaub , Otto Finsch  and other members of the German Ornithologists' Society in Journal für Ornithologie online BHL
The Ibis

References

Bird
Birding and ornithology by year